Matthew Stachiw (born 1895, Nushche, d. 1978, also spelt 'Matwij' or 'Mathew') was a Ukrainian politician. He served in the Ukrainian Army between 1918 and 1920. Afterwards received a LL.D. from the University of Prague. He worked as a lawyer, university teacher and editor of several publications.

Stachiw represented the Ukrainian Socialist-Radical Party in the Executive Committee of the Labour and Socialist International between August 1931 and 1940.

As of the early 1960s, Stachiw served as editor of the weekly newspaper Narodna Volya (issued from Scranton). He was also active in various Ukrainian-American associations.

References

Members of the Executive of the Labour and Socialist International
1895 births
1978 deaths
People from the Kingdom of Galicia and Lodomeria
Ukrainian Austro-Hungarians
Ukrainian Radical Party politicians
Ukrainian emigrants to the United States